Les fêtes de Ramire (The Celebrations of Ramiro ) is an opera in the form of a one-act acte de ballet by Jean-Philippe Rameau with a libretto by Voltaire, first performed on 22 December 1745 at the Palace of Versailles.

Voltaire wrote a new libretto to make use of music taken from his and Rameau's comédie-ballet La princesse de Navarre, which had been performed earlier in 1745. Since both Rameau and Voltaire were busy writing a new opera, Le temple de la Gloire, the Duke of Richelieu entrusted the job of fitting the music to the new libretto and adjusting the verse accordingly to Jean-Jacques Rousseau. Rousseau, who had not yet won his reputation as a major thinker, was an aspiring musician. In his later autobiographical Confessions, Rousseau wrote he had worked hard on the task but Madame de la Pouplinière, Richelieu's mistress and an ardent champion of Rameau, rejected his efforts out of hand and sent the opera back to Rameau to revise.

Rousseau claimed he was responsible for the overture and some recitatives, but that Rameau and Voltaire had stolen all the credit. However, according to the musicologist Graham Sadler, only one "undistinguished" monologue "O mort, viens terminer les douleurs de ma vie" has been positively identified as Rousseau's. Nevertheless, the episode sowed the seeds for Rousseau's unrelenting hatred of Rameau, which would lead to the Querelle des Bouffons in the 1750s.

Roles

Synopsis
Scene: A prison

The Spanish king Alphonse has taken Fatime, Princess of Granada, captive after killing her father. In prison, Fatime longs for death (Air: O mort viens terminer les douleurs de ma vie) but her confidante Isbé tries to comfort her with the hope that Alphonse's son Ramire is not as cruel. There is a sound of trumpets and the scene changes to an "agreeable place". Warriors tell Fatime that Cupid is on her side and fortune tellers predict a bright future. Isbé is now convinced that Ramire is in love with Fatime but the latter is still fearful until the prince finally appears in person and pledges his faith to her during another divertissement involving the Graces, Cupids, Pleasures and Games. Fatime is at last won over.

Footnotes

References
Manuscript score: Les Festes de Ramire. Mise en musique par Monsieur Rameau (accessible for free at IMSLP)
Original libretto: Les Festes de Ramire, Ballet donné à Versailles, Le 22 Décembre 1745, Paris, Ballard, 1745 (accessible for free online at Gallica - B.N.F.)
Girdlestone, Cuthbert, Jean-Philippe Rameau: His Life and Work, New York: Dover, 1969  (paperback edition)
Holden, Amanda (Ed.), The New Penguin Opera Guide, New York: Penguin Putnam, 2001. 
Sadler, Graham,(Ed.), The New Grove French Baroque Masters  Grove/Macmillan, 1988

External links

Fetes de Ramire
Fetes de Ramire
Fetes de Ramire
Fetes de Ramire
Fetes de Ramire
Ballets by Jean-Philippe Rameau